Tyr (stylized as ᛏᛉᚱ) is the fifteenth studio album by English heavy metal band Black Sabbath, released in August 1990 by I.R.S. Records.

The album title, and several song titles, allude to Norse mythology, which led many to call Tyr a concept album, although bassist Neil Murray dispelled that in 2005, stating that while many of the songs may seem loosely related, very little of the album has to do with mythology and it was not intended to be a concept recording.

Album information
The album's departure from the darker lyrics of Headless Cross was discussed by Tony Iommi in his 2012 autobiography Iron Man: "For our next album, Tyr, we went back to the Woodcray Studios in February 1990, with me and Cozy producing it again. On Headless Cross, Tony [Martin] had just come into the band and he assumed, oh, Black Sabbath, it's all about the Devil, so his lyrics were full of the Devil and Satan. It was too much in your face. We told him to be a bit more subtle about it, so for Tyr he did all these lyrics about Nordic gods and whatnot. It took me a while to get my head around that."

This album represents possibly the most dramatic departure from Black Sabbath's traditional sound, with only traces of it found in the occasional riff. The production has been criticised by some (who claim Cozy Powell's drums drown out most of the other instruments) and praised by others, who note that this is one of Sabbath's heaviest albums and perhaps the most prominently reliant on keyboards by the perennial fifth member, Geoff Nicholls.

The band have stated that while they do not disown or regret the song "Feels Good to Me", it was put on the album solely to be released as a single and does not fit in musically with the rest of the record.

Geezer Butler, Ian Gillan and Brian May made guest appearances on the European leg of the Tyr tour; Butler and May appearing during the encore of the show performed on 8 September 1990 at the Hammersmith Odeon in London.

In Norse mythology, Týr is the god of single combat and heroic glory, and the son of Odin. The runes on the cover, ᛏ, ᛉ, and ᚱ are taken from the Rök runestone in Sweden. The middle rune, algiz, is transcribed as the modern letter x or z, not y.

Legacy
The only track to feature on post-Tyr tours was "Anno Mundi", e.g. on the Cross Purposes Live VHS/DVD. Tony Martin re-recorded "Jerusalem" for his 1992 solo album Back Where I Belong. The Black Sabbath line-up that recorded Tyr would reunite to record their eighteenth studio album, Forbidden, in 1995. Frontman Heri Joensen of Viking metal band Týr claims to have been influenced by the album cover when designing his own band's logo.

Track listing

Personnel
 Tony Iommi – lead, rhythm & acoustic guitars, production
 Cozy Powell – drums, percussion, production
 Tony Martin – lead & backing vocals
 Neil Murray – bass
 Geoff Nicholls – keyboards

Additional personnel
 Sean Lynch – engineering
 Leif Mases – mixing
 Tony Cousins – mastering

Release history
1990: IRS EIRSA-1038, UK, vinyl
1990: IRS EIRSACV1038, UK, picture disc
1990: IRS 1C-064-24-1070-1, EU, vinyl
1990: IRS 24-1070-2, UK / EU, CD
1990: IRS X2-13049, US, CD
1999: EMI 07243-5-21298-2-9, EU, CD

Charts

References

External links
 

1990 albums
Albums recorded at Rockfield Studios
Black Sabbath albums
I.R.S. Records albums
Norse mythology in music